John Patrick Amama Mbabazi, SC (simply known as Amama Mbabazi, born 16 January 1949) is a Ugandan politician who served as the ninth Prime Minister of Uganda from 24 May 2011 to 19 September 2014. He played an instrumental role in Uganda's protracted liberation struggle from several tyrannical governments (1972-1986) and is a founding member of the National Resistance Movement, the ruling political party in Uganda.

Mbabazi served as the member of parliament for the Kinkiizi West constituency in Kanungu District, a position held from 1996 until 2016, when he ran unsuccessfully for the Presidency.

Early life and education
He was born in Mparo Village, Rukiga County, in present-day Rukiga District, on 16 January 1949. He attended two of the most prominent educational institutions in Uganda during both the colonial and post-colonial periods: Kigezi College Butobere for his high school education, and Ntare School for his A-Levels. Mbabazi earned a Bachelor of Laws from Makerere University. He received a postgraduate Diploma in Legal Practice from the Law Development Center in Kampala. He is an Advocate of the Courts of Judicature of Uganda and has been a member of the Uganda Law Society since 1977.

Career
Before joining politics, he worked as a state attorney in the Attorney General's Chambers from 1976 to 1978, rising to the position of secretary of the Uganda Law Council from 1977 to 1979.

Between 1986 and 1992, he served as head of the External Security Organisation.

He has also served as Minister of State in the President's Office, in charge of political affairs.

He became secretary of the NRM caucus in the Constituent Assembly that drafted the 1995 Uganda Constitution.

Between 1986 and 1992, he was Minister of State for Defence. Subsequently, he served as Minister of State for Regional Cooperation from 1998 to 2001. He was Attorney General and Minister of Justice from 2004 to 2006, a feat that earned him the moniker "Super Minister". He was appointed as Minister of Defence in 2006, a position he held until he was appointed as Minister of Security. He served as Minister of Security from February 2009 until May 2011, when he was appointed Prime Minister.

He was Secretary General of the NRM from November 2005 to January 2015.

Presidential bid 
Mbabazi's childhood friend Ruhakana Rugunda was appointed to replace Mbabazi as Prime Minister on 18 September 2014, by President Yoweri Museveni. This move was seen by many as Museveni's way of punishing Mbabazi for his rumoured presidential run. On 15 June 2015, Mbabazi declared his intentions to run against Yoweri Museveni for the National Resistance Movement's nomination for president at the party's convention on 4 October 2015. This declaration was followed by a response from President Museveni who dubbed it "bad conduct and premature". On 31 July, after much disagreement between top-ranking party officials and Mbabazi himself, the former Prime Minister declared he would stand as an independent candidate.  His candidature is backed by The Democratic Alliance (TDA), a loose convergence of minor political parties working to win the position of presidency.

In the 2016 general election he received 1.39% of the vote, placing third.

Diplomacy
Mbabazi has represented Uganda in international fora, including the United Nations Security Council, where he argued for the international community to allow the Uganda People's Defense Force to pursue the Lord's Resistance Army fighters into the Democratic Republic of the Congo.

References

External links
Amama Mbabazi Official Website
 Amama Mbabazi's Road To Prime Minister
 Uganda Told To Repay Aid Funds Lost In Office of the Prime Minister Fraud 
 Fallout From Temangalo Scandal

|-

|-

|-

}

1949 births
Living people
Makerere University alumni
Members of the Parliament of Uganda
National Resistance Movement politicians
People from Kanungu District
Prime Ministers of Uganda
Defense ministers of Uganda
20th-century Ugandan lawyers
Law Development Centre alumni
Attorneys General of Uganda
People educated at Ntare School
21st-century Ugandan politicians